The Little Clatskanie River is a short tributary of the Clatskanie River in Columbia County in the U.S. state of Oregon. It begins near Sarafin Point in the Northern Oregon Coast Range northwest of St. Helens and flows generally north to meet the larger stream near the unincorporated community of Apiary. The Little Clatskanie has no named tributaries.

According to Fishing in Oregon, the entire Clatskanie system supports a population of resident cutthroat trout.

See also
 List of rivers of Oregon

References

Rivers of Oregon
Rivers of Columbia County, Oregon